Ilija Trojanow (Bulgarian: Илия Троянов, also transliterated as Ilya Troyanov; born 23 August 1965 in Sofia) is a Bulgarian–German writer, translator and publisher.

Life and literary career

Trojanow was born in Sofia, Bulgaria in 1965. In 1971 his family fled Bulgaria through Yugoslavia and Italy to Germany, where they received political asylum. In 1972 the family travelled on to Kenya, where Ilija's father had obtained a job as engineer. With one interruption from 1977 to 1981, Ilija Trojanow lived in Nairobi until 1984, and attended the German School Nairobi. After a stay in Paris, he studied law and ethnology at Munich University from 1985 to 1989. He interrupted these studies to found Kyrill-und-Method-Verlag in 1989, and after that Marino-Verlag in 1992, both of which specialised in African literature. In 1999 Trojanow moved to Mumbai and became intensely involved with Indian life and culture. He has lived in Cape Town, returned to Germany (Mainz), and then to Austria, where he currently resides in Vienna.

In the 1990s Trojanow wrote several non-fiction and travel books about Africa, published an anthology of contemporary African literature and translated African authors into German. His first novel, "Die Welt ist groß und Rettung lauert überall", appeared in 1996. In it he recounts his family's experiences as political refugees and asylum seekers. After that appeared the science fiction novel "Autopol", created on the Internet as a "novel in progress," "Hundezeiten", a travel account of a visit to his Bulgarian homeland, and books dealing with his experiences in India. His reportage "Zu den heiligen Quellen des Islam" describes a pilgrimage to Mecca.

Since 2002 Ilija Trojanow has been member of the PEN centre of the Federal Republic of Germany. Among other awards he received the Bertelsmann Literature Prize at the Ingeborg Bachmann competition in Klagenfurt in 1995, the Marburg Literature Prize in 1996, the Thomas Valentin Prize in 1997, the Adelbert von Chamisso Prize in 2000 and the Leipzig Book Fair Prize in the category of fiction for his novel "Der Weltensammler".

Published in English as The Collector of Worlds in 2006, this novel was inspired by the biography and travel writings of British colonial officer Richard Francis Burton, some of whose travels Trojanow followed to places in present-day India, Saudi-Arabia or Tanzania.

In 2014, Trojanow participated in the writer in residence programme of the one world foundation in Sri Lanka.

Miscellaneous 
In 2013, Trojanow, who has also written on freedom of expression and surveillance of citizens by government agencies in Germany, had criticized the National Security Agency (NSA). In the same year, he was denied entry into the US for undisclosed reasons. He planned to attend an academic conference. Upon intervention by representatives of the P.E.N. and the German cultural institution Goethe-Institut, he could finally travel to New York at the end of 2013.

Works

In Afrika, Munich, 1993 (with Michael Martin)
Naturwunder Ostafrika, Munich, 1994 (with Michael Martin)
Hüter der Sonne (Custodians of the Sun), Munich, 1996 (with Chenjerai Hove)
Kenia mit Nordtansania, Munich, 1996
Die Welt ist groß und Rettung lauert überall, Munich, 1996
Autopol, Munich, 1997
Zimbabwe, Munich, 1998
Hundezeiten, Munich, 1999
Der Sadhu an der Teufelswand, Munich, 2001
An den inneren Ufern Indiens (Along the Ganges), Munich, 2003
Zu den heiligen Quellen des Islam (Mumbai to Mecca), Munich, 2004
Der Weltensammler (The Collector of Worlds), Munich, 2006
Indien. Land des kleinen Glücks, Cadolzburg, 2006
Gebrauchsanweisung für Indien, Munich, 2006
Die fingierte Revolution. Bulgarien, eine exemplarische Geschichte, Munich, 2006
Nomade auf vier Kontinenten, Frankfurt, 2007
Kampfabsage. Kulturen bekämpfen sich nicht – sie fließen zusammen, Munich, 2007 (with Ranjit Hoskote)
Der entfesselte Globus, Munich, 2008
Sehnsucht, Freiburg, 2008 (edited by Fatma Sagir)
 Kumbh Mela. Das größte Fest der Welt, München 2008 (photographs by Thomas Dorn)
 Angriff auf die Freiheit. Sicherheitswahn, Überwachungsstaat und der Abbau bürgerlicher Rechte, Munich 2009 (with Juli Zeh)
 EisTau, Munich, 2011 (novel)
 Die Versuchungen der Fremde: Unterwegs in Arabien, Indien und Afrika, Munich, 2011
 Confluences: Forgotten Histories From East And West (co-authored with Ranjit Hoskote), New Delhi, Yoda Press 2012 
 Der überflüssige Mensch, Salzburg, 2013
 Macht und Widerstand, Frankfurt am Main 2015
 Meine Olympiade, Frankfurt am Main, 2016
 Doppelte Spur, Frankfurt am Main: Fischer, 2020,

English translations 
Custodians of the Sun
Along the Ganges, translation by Ranjit Hoskote, Penguin Books India & Haus Publishing, 2005
Mumbai to Mecca, London, 2007, Haus Publishing
The Collector of Worlds, London, 2008
The Lamentations of Zeno, translation by Philip Boehm of Eis Tau, Verso Books, New York, 2016

Publishing

Afrikanissimo, Wuppertal, 1991 (with Peter Ripken)
Das Huhn das schreit gehört dem Fremden (The screaming Chicken belongs to the Stranger), Munich, 1998
Döner in Walhalla (Doner in Valhalla), Cologne, 2000
Die Welt des Ryszard Kapuściński. Seine besten Geschichten und Reportagen, Frankfurt, 2007
Egon Erwin Kisch. Die schönsten Geschichten und Reportagen, Berlin, 2008

Translations into German
Sobornost. Kirche, Bibel, Tradition (Bible, church, tradition) by Georgij V. Florovskij, München 1989
Der Berg am Rande des Himmels (The Mountain on the Edge of the Sky) by Timothy Wangusa, Munich, 1989
Knochen (Bones) by Chenjerai Hove, Munich, 1990
Der Preis der Freiheit (The Price of Freedom) by Tsitsi Dangarembga, Reinbek bei Hamburg, 1991
Buckingham Palace (Buckingham Palace, district six) by Richard Rive, München 1994
Die Sklaverei der Gewürze by Shafi Adam Shafi, München 1997
Der letzte Ausweis (Identity card) by F. M. Esfandiary, Frankfurt, 2009

Film adaptations 
The World is Big and Salvation Lurks Around the Corner, 2007, directed by Stefan Komandarev with Miki Manojlovic as Bai Dan and Carlo Ljubek as Alexander

References

External links

Literature by and about Ilija Trojanow (in German) in the catalogue of the DDB, or German National Library
Biography, Lettre Ulysses Award jury member (in English)
The collector of worlds, on Trojanov's novel of the same name, at signandsight.com
Ilija Trojanow on F.M. Esfandiary: Searching for Identity in Iran's Labyrinthine Bureaucracy

1965 births
Living people
Bulgarian emigrants to Germany
Translators to German
Writers from Sofia
Ludwig Maximilian University of Munich alumni
Bulgarian translators
People denied entry to the United States
German male writers